Pétur Eyþórsson (born 22 July 1978 in Húsavík) is an Icelandic glima, a variation of Scandinavian folk wrestling, champion. He won the glima grettisbelt several times and was voted the best wrestler during the first IGA world championship.

Awards
He was the Glima King of Iceland in 2004, 2005, 2007, 2009, 2010, 2011, and 2012.

Family
He is the son of Eyþór Pétursson, a famous glima wrestler in the 1980s.

References

External links
International Glima Association
The Icelandic Wrestling Federation (Glímusamband Íslands)
The Gripping History of Glima
Glíma! Pathe Pictorial (1932)  (youtube.com)
The Viking Glima Federation

Petur Eythorsson
1978 births
Living people
Petur Eythorsson